Everybody Has a Plan is a 2012 crime thriller film directed by Ana Piterbarg and starring Viggo Mortensen and Soledad Villamil. It was written by Anna Cohan and Ana Piterbarg. It is an Argentine-Spanish-German co-production.

Synopsis 
Agustín (Viggo Mortensen) is a man desperate to abandon what has gradually become a frustrating existence after living for years in Buenos Aires. After his twin brother Pedro's death (Viggo Mortensen), Agustín sets out to begin a new life assuming Pedro's identity and returning to the mysterious Paraná Delta region, which was the childhood home of both brothers. However, shortly after his return, Agustín is involuntarily involved in the dangerous criminal world that his brother had been part of.

Cast

Reception 
Manuel Piñón of Cinemanía rated the "surprising" noir film 4 out of 5 stars, considering that it is "written with astounding smarts and accuracy".

Rob Nelson of Variety considered that the "tepid" Spanish-language drama is undermined by its "slow pacing, thinly drawn characters, a limp climax and humorless tone".

See also 
 List of Argentine films of 2012
 List of Spanish films of 2012

References

External links 
 
 
 Official Site

2012 films
2012 crime drama films
2012 crime thriller films
2012 psychological thriller films
20th Century Fox films
2010s Spanish-language films
Films about twin brothers
Films set in Argentina
Films shot in Buenos Aires
Films scored by Federico Jusid
Argentine crime drama films
Argentine crime thriller films
Spanish crime drama films
Spanish crime thriller films
German crime drama films
German crime thriller films
Tornasol Films films
2010s Spanish films
2010s Argentine films
2010s German films